Danghyang Nirartha, also known as Pedanda Shakti Wawu Rauh, was a Shaivite religious figure in Bali and a Hindu traveler during the 16th century. He was the founder of the Shaivite priesthood in Bali.

Early life 
Nirartha came to Bali in 1537 to become the chief counselor to the Gelgel king Dalem Baturenggong. He had left the royal courts of Blambangan, Java, with his family earlier that year after one of the wives of his patron had fallen into unrequited love with him. Some myths state that he made the journey from Java to Bali on top of a pumpkin, giving rise to the taboo among some Balinese Brahmins on the consumption of pumpkins.

After arrival 

After arriving in Bali, he arrived in the court of King Dalem Baturenggong. Bali had been hit with many plagues in the years before, and Nirartha presented the king with a hair from his head, stating that this would remove the sufferings. This hair was placed in a temple which became a prominent Shaivite pilgrimage spot in Bali.

Architecture 

Nirartha was the creator of the padmasana architecture in Balinese Hindu temples. These temples are considered by devotees to be the embodiment of the supreme Shiva. The temples on the coasts of Bali were augmented with the padmasana shrines by the dozen during the travels of Nirartha.

Religious work 

Nirartha was responsible for facilitating a refashioning of Balinese Hinduism. He was an important promoter of the idea of moksha in Indonesia. He founded the Shaivite priesthood that is now ubiquitous in Bali, and is now regarded as the ancestor of all Shaivite Pedandas.

Footnotes

References 

 Pringle,Robert. (2004) A Short History of Bali: Indonesia's Hindu Realm. Crows Nest, NSW: Allan & Unwin .
 Hinduism and Islam in Indonesia: Bali and the Pasisir World Indonesia, Vol. 44. (Oct., 1987), pp. 30–58.

Javanese people
Shaivite religious leaders
Hindu missionaries
Hinduism in Bali
Year of death unknown
Year of birth unknown
Indonesian missionaries
Indonesian Hindu religious leaders